Mordecai ben Abraham Crémieux (1749 – May 22, 1825) was a rabbi at Aix, Provence. He was the author of Ma'amar Mordekhai ('Treatise of Mordecai'), a commentary on the Shulḥan Arukh, Oraḥ Ḥayyim, in two parts (Leghorn, 1784). He also financed the first siddur according to the Provençal rite.

See also

References

External links
 Online version of Ma'amar Mordekhai

1749 births
1825 deaths
18th-century French rabbis
19th-century French rabbis
Authors of books on Jewish law
French Orthodox rabbis
People from Aix-en-Provence
People from Carpentras
Provençal Jews